SHAFTA Awards or Shafta Awards can mean:

 Shafta Awards (journalism), annual awards for journalism
 SHAFTA Awards (adult video), annual awards for adult film making